The Battle of Pago was a military operation that took place in 1520, and in which Portuguese forces successfully attacked Pago, where the former Sultan of Malacca Mahmud Shah had built a fortified camp to harass Portuguese Malacca.

Context
The second Portuguese governor of India Afonso de Albuquerque captured the great Malay city of Malacca in 1511, but Sultan Mahmud survived the battle and fled with his Court and army. He later built a base at Pago, upstream the Muar River, from where he continuously harassed the city of Malacca by land and sea, in the hopes of recovering it.

In order to deal with the threat, governor Lopo Soares de Albergaria, dispatched three ships and 300 soldiers to Malacca under the command of Dom Aleixo de Meneses, who arrived in June 1518. He blockaded the mouth of the Muar River and so the Sultan sought terms. Inexperienced, Dom Aleixo naively accepted a peace treaty, but after he departed with his men to Goa, the Sultan laid siege to Malacca on the land side, while 85 lancharas attacked from the sea side. Failing to overcome Portuguese defenses however, at the end of 17 days the sultan called off the attack, having suffering 600 dead, while 15 Portuguese were killed in the action. 

A Javanese captain whose wife the sultan had apparently taken defected to the Portuguese, and revealed the sultans defenses at Muar. The Portuguese directed an expedition to the mouth of the river, and there they destroyed a fortified stockade the sultan had built across the water, capturing 60 cannon. 

When Dom Aleixo informed the Governor of the situation at Malacca, he dispatched two carracks, a caravel, a brigantine and 150 soldiers under the command of António Correia to the city, while Garcia de Sá was appointed as new captain of Malacca.

With these reinforcements, the Portuguese were able to force all of the Sultans men still in the vicinity of Malacca to withdraw to Pago in September 1519, after two months fighting. On July 15 1520 António Correia set out to disperse the Sultans camp at Pago, with 150 Portuguese and 300 Malay auxiliaries on a small flotilla of 2 carracks, 1 caravel, 2-4 galliots and a number of native Malay lancharas.

The Battle of Pago

Sailing up Muar, the Portuguese found close to Pago another fortified stockade built across the river. Correia had it attacked by a caravel equipped with pavises and heavy caliber artillery, towed by the longboats. Despite the opposition of Malay fire and poisoned arrows, Portuguese soldiers assaulted the stockade, and captured it after a brief fight while the sailors opened the door to allow their ships to pass through.

The caravel and the carracks were left behind keeping watch, and further up the river the Portuguese found the access to Pago blocked by numerous vertical wooden stakes driven into the muddy river floor, along with numerous trees and logs felled into the water. They were energetically removed from the way by a team of Portuguese carpenters, the sailors and the soldiers, until eventually they managed to reach Pago, where the Sultan had 2000 men and war-elephants.

Although Correia had ordered no man to engage before they had all landed in good order, he was ignored by his own officers and soldiers; they disembarked under the cover of the vessels artillery, and vigorously attacked the Sultans forces onshore, which were forced to abandon their position and escape to the jungle after a brief clash.

Aftermath
Correia armed a number of fidalgos as knights at some houses that had belonged to the sultan. Considerable spoil and some POWs were captured at Pago while Sultans fleet, numbering over 100 oarvessels was torched. Two large vessels, with gilded bows and stern were taken to Malacca as war-trophies.

After being defeated at Pago, many of the sultans captains defected, and lacking a fleet he withdrew via Pahang to the island of Bintan, which he usurped from the native king and from where he would continue to fight the Portuguese in the future.

The attack on Pago was later recorded in the Malay Annals oral chronicle, which reads:

See also
Portuguese Malacca
Portuguese conquest of Malacca
Battle of Lingga
Siege of Bintan

References 

Pago
Pago (1520)
Pago
1520 in the Portuguese Empire
Portuguese Malacca
History of Malacca